Rosalind Pollack Petchesky (born August 16, 1942) is an American political scientist, and Distinguished Professor of Political Science at Hunter College, City University of New York. She is the founder of the International Reproductive Rights Research Action Group (IRRAG).

Early life and education 
Rosalind Pollack Petchesky was born in Bay City, Texas to Roberta Friedman and Simon Pollack.

Petchesky graduated from Smith College summa cum laude, and has a Ph.D. in political science from Columbia University. She previously taught at Ramapo College.

Career 
Petchesky is known for incorporating differing theoretical frameworks, including ethics, political philosophy, history, political science, and others, into the study of reproductive rights.

From 1972 to 1987 she was Professor of Political and Social Theory at Ramapo College of New Jersey. In 1987 she was hired as Professor of Political Science and Coordinator of Women's Studies at Hunter College in New York. Petchesky lectures widely and is the author/editor of many professional articles and numerous books.

Petchesky is on the international advisory board of Signs, an international journal in women's and gender studies.

Petchesky retired from teaching in 2013.

Awards
1995 MacArthur Fellows Program

Works
  The first edition was winner of the American Historical Association's 1984 Joan Kelly Memorial Prize in Women's History. Second revised edition: 1990. 
 
 
 
  
  
  Preview.
  Preview.

References

External links
 Rosalind Petchesky papers at the Sophia Smith Collection, Smith College Special Collections

American political scientists
American political philosophers
Smith College alumni
Columbia Graduate School of Arts and Sciences alumni
Ramapo College faculty
Hunter College faculty
MacArthur Fellows
Living people
1942 births
Women political scientists